Urophora longicauda is a species of tephritid or fruit flies in the genus Urophora of the family Tephritidae.

Distribution
Russia, Armenia, Kazakhstan, Uzbekistan, Kyrgyzstan, Afghanistan

References

Urophora
Insects described in 1927
Diptera of Asia